MSN Travel (previously Bing Travel, Live Search Farecast, and Farecast.com) is an airfare prediction website in the computer reservations system industry. It premiered to the public as Farecast on May 15, 2007. Until 2014, it offered predictions regarding the best time to purchase airline tickets.

History
Farecast was founded in 2003; Farecast's team of data miners used airfare observations to build algorithms to predict future airfare price movements. In April 2008, Farecast was acquired by Microsoft for $115 million. Microsoft officially integrated it as part of its Live Search group of tools in May 2008. On June 3, 2009, Microsoft officially rebranded Live Search Farecast as Bing Travel as part of its efforts to create a new search identity.

In January 2014, the airfare prediction feature was removed.

In May 2015, Microsoft rebranded Bing Travel to MSN Travel and redirected the Bing URL to MSN Travel.

In August 2015, MSN Travel flight search pages changed from being powered by KAYAK to competitor Skyscanner.

Controversy
In 2009, there were allegations that Bing Travel had copied its layouts from Kayak.com. Microsoft denied the allegations.

References

External links
 

Travel
American travel websites
Transport companies established in 2006
Internet properties established in 2006
Travel ticket search engines
Microsoft websites